Kurt Lück (December 28, 1900, in Kolmar (today Chodzież ), Province of Posen – March 5, 1942, near Orsha, Belarus) was a German historian and SS Obersturmbannführer.
He was an ethnographer, an activist minority in Poland and lieutenant colonel in the body of SS officers, doctor of philosophical sciences.

1900 births
1942 deaths
People from Chodzież
People from the Province of Posen
20th-century German historians
German male non-fiction writers
SS-Obersturmbannführer
Waffen-SS personnel
German military personnel killed in World War II